Lake Hamilton High School is a public secondary school for grades 10 through 12 located in Pearcy, Arkansas, located near Lake Hamilton and Lake Catherine. LHHS supports more than 900 students with more than 50 educators.

Academics
LHHS is accredited by the Arkansas Department of Education (ADE) and has been accredited by AdvancED since 2011. Students compete a program of study that completes with the ADE Smart Core curriculum. Lake Hamilton offers a variety of educational programs, including English as a Second Language (ESL), Advanced Placement (AP), character and drug education programs, homeless child and youth programs, career and technical education, and special needs and special education classes.

Senior high students may take advantage of the accelerated classes in the core content areas which provide challenging curricular materials to meet their needs. In addition, students may choose Pre-AP and Advanced Placement classes in the University Studies Program, which provide college level material and college credit by examination. Concurrent credit in academic classes is also available through National Park Community College.

Extracurricular activities
The Lake Hamilton mascot for academic and athletic teams in the Wolves with maroon and gold serving as the school colors.

Clubs and traditions 
The Lake Hamilton Band Program, known as The Lake Hamilton Power Band, were the Grand Champions of the Class 6A 2019 State Champions. In 2019 the Power Band were Bands of America Grand National Semi-Finalists. In 2019 the band placed 2nd in the Scholastic Open class at the WGI Winds Finals.

In November 2007, the Lake Hamilton FFA Chapter's poultry judging team represented Arkansas at the National FFA Poultry Contest and finished third, with three team members winning scholarships. Other recent past state champions include Prepared Public Speaking in 2009, Nursery/Landscape in 2005, Floriculture in 1998 and 2004, Livestock in 2003, Ag Mechanics in 1997, 1998, 1999, 2000 and 2002, Poultry in 1999 and 2001, Farm Business in 2000, Creed Speaking in 2014, and Food Science in 2014.

Athletics
The Wolves compete in the state's 6A classification administered by the Arkansas Activities Association. Interscholastic sporting activities include football, volleyball, golf (boys/girls), bowling (boys/girls), cross country (boys/girls), basketball, cheer, swimming (boys/girls), soccer (boys/girls), baseball, softball and track and field (boys/girls).

Football
Head Coach: Tommy Gilleran
Other Coaches: Stan Cooper, Dale Gilleran, Brandon Starr, Matt Kinsinger, Greg Mundy, David Davenport
 The Wolves football team won  state football championship in 1992 and 2008.

Volleyball
Head Coach: Karen Smith
 The Lady Wolves volleyball team captured a state volleyball championship in 2007.

Bowling
Head Coach: John Utley

Basketball 
Boys Coach: Scotty Pennington
Girls Coach: Blake Condley

Track and Cross Country
Head Coach: Karl Koonce – a 2009 National Coach of the Year award recipient by the National Federation of State High School Associations (NFHS) Coaches Association.
The boys track team won three consecutive state track and field championships (2008, 2009, 2010).
The boys cross country team won four consecutive state cross country championships (2006, 2007, 2008, 2009).
The girls track team won state track and field championships with titles in 2007 and 2011.
The girls cross country team are 7-time state champions with titles in 1985–87, 1990, 2006, 2011–12.

Soccer
Head Coach: Stan Cooper
 Tennis
 The Lady Wolves tennis team won the 6A class state tennis championship in 2012.

Baseball
Head Coach: Mac Hurley

Softball
Head Coach: Amy Teague
Assistant Coach: Karen Smith
 The Lady Wolves fastpitch softball team are 3-time state softball champions with titles in 2007, 2009 and 2012.

Notable alumni

 Bruce Cozart, member of the Arkansas House of Representatives from District 24 in Garland County; former member of the LHHS School Board  
 Allen McDill, Former MLB Pitcher (Kansas City Royals, Detroit Tigers, Boston Red Sox)
 Kalin Olson, Playboy playmate (August 1997 centerfold)
 Trenton Lee Stewart, Author of The Mysterious Benedict Society
 Adam Brown, KIA - Operation Enduring Freedom, Afghanistan, 03/18/2010

References

External links
 

Public high schools in Arkansas
Schools in Garland County, Arkansas